James "Pat" Rooney was an American football coach.  He served as the head football coach at North Park College—now known as North Park University—in Chicago for three seasons, from 1964 to 1966, compiling a record of 2–21–1.

Head coaching record

References

Year of birth missing
Possibly living people
North Park Vikings football coaches